Edward Greer (born March 8, 1924) is a retired United States Army major general.

Early life and enlisted service
Greer was born and grew up in Gary, West Virginia. He enrolled West Virginia State University, which had a mandatory ROTC requirement, with the intent of becoming a dentist before enlisting in the Army in 1943 after his freshman year. He served in the 777th Field Battalion and was discharged as a Master Sergeant.  Greer returned to West Virginia State after the war and was commissioned a second lieutenant in field artillery after graduating in 1948.

Career as a commissioned officer
Greer was initially stationed at Fort Riley after commissioning. He served as a forward observer with 159th Field Artillery Battalion attached to the 25th Infantry Division in the Korean War and was awarded the Silver Star and the Bronze Star for valor. Greer was promoted to captain while in Korea and was posted to Germany after his deployment to Korea followed by an assignment to the Pentagon with the Army General Staff, during which time attended graduate school at George Washington University.

Greer, then a Colonel, deployed to Vietnam in 1970 as the deputy commander of XXIV Corps Artillery before taking command of the 108th Artillery Group. During his deployment he was awarded the Legion of Merit, the Air Medal and the Vietnamese Cross of Gallantry. In 1972, Greer was promoted to the rank of Brigadier General. After serving as the Deputy Commanding General of Fort Leonard Wood, Missouri, he was assigned to be the Deputy Commanding General at the U.S. Army Military Personnel Center in Washington, D.C. in 1972 and promoted to Major General later that year. Greer retired from the Army in 1976.

Post-Military life
Greer moved to El Paso, Texas after retirement from the Army and became a realtor.

References

1924 births
Recipients of the Air Medal
Recipients of the Legion of Merit
United States Army generals
United States Army personnel of the Korean War
United States Army personnel of the Vietnam War
United States Army personnel of World War II
West Virginia State University alumni
People from Gary, West Virginia
Living people